375th may refer to:

375th Air Mobility Wing, unit of the United States Air Force assigned to Eighteenth Air Forcestationed at Scott Air Force Base, Illinois
375th Bombardment Squadron, inactive United States Air Force unit
375th Fighter Squadron or 172d Air Support Squadron, unit of the Michigan Air National Guard 110th Airlift Wing
375th Operations Group, the operational flying component of the United States Air Force 375th Air Mobility Wing

See also
375 (number)
375, the year 375 (CCCLXXV) of the Julian calendar
375 BC